Capoeta pyragyi is a species of cyprinid in the genus Capoeta. It lives in the Tireh and Sezar rivers of Iran, and it is named after Turkmen poet and spiritual leader Magtymguly Pyragy.

References

pyragyi
Fish described in 2017